The Black Crown (French: La Couronne noire, Spanish: La corona negra) is a 1951 French-Spanish film noir directed by Luis Saslavsky and starring María Félix, Rossano Brazzi and Vittorio Gassman. It is based on the story La Vénus d'Ille by Prosper Mérimée.

Synopsis 
In the city of Tangier, a woman named Mara (María Félix) suffers from amnesia after murdering her husband, who was about to demand a divorce for having caught her in illicit love affairs with a lover (Vittorio Gassman), who only loves her. interested in finding the place where some precious jewels are hidden. Disoriented, the woman runs away from her and finds the help of Andrés, who falls in love with her and tries to get her memory back. Although her patron saint sees in the tarot cards that a black crown that portends death revolves around the mysterious woman, Andrés ignores her and goes with her to the hotel where the clues indicate that he was staying with her. Mara is kidnapped by her former lover and locked in a gym on her property, but being amnesiac she can't tell him where she hid her husband's jewelry.

Cast
 María Félix as Mara Russell  
 Rossano Brazzi as Andrés  
 Vittorio Gassman as Mauricio  
 José María Lado as Sr. Russel 
 Antonia Plana as Señora Russel  
 Avelino Santana 
 Julia Caba Alba as Flora  
 Manuel Arbó as Orlando  
 Antonia Herrero 
 Félix Fernández as El jardinero  
 Concha López Silva
 Casimiro Hurtado as El conde Ludovico  
 Carmen Moreno
 Francisco Pierrá as Pío  
 Dayna
 Santiago Rivero as Don Enrique  
 María Cañete as Ana  
 Mariano Alcón 
 María Francés as María  
 Domingo Rivas as Abogado de Mauricio  
 Diana Salcedo
 Piéral as Pablo, the dwarf 
 Arturo Bragaglia

References

Bibliography 
 Cynthia Tompkins & David William Foster. Notable Twentieth-century Latin American Women: A Biographical Dictionary''. Greenwood Publishing Group, 2001.

External links 
 

1951 films
1951 drama films
Spanish drama films
1950s Spanish-language films
Films based on works by Prosper Mérimée
Films directed by Luis Saslavsky
Films with screenplays by Jean Cocteau
Films scored by Juan Quintero Muñoz
Films based on short fiction
French black-and-white films
Spanish black-and-white films
1950s Spanish films
French drama films
Spanish-language French films